Utricularia geoffrayi is a small, probably perennial, terrestrial carnivorous plant that belongs to the genus Utricularia. U. geoffrayi is native to Indochina and can be found in Cambodia, Thailand, and Vietnam. It was originally published and described by François Pellegrin in 1920. It has been collected in flower between September and December.

Utricularia ramosissima from Ubon Ratchathani Province in northeastern Thailand was described as a separate species. It is regarded as a synonym of U. geoffrayi.

See also 
 List of Utricularia species

References 

Carnivorous plants of Asia
Flora of Cambodia
Flora of Thailand
Flora of Vietnam
geoffrayi
Taxa named by François Pellegrin